The Ariel String Quartet is a string quartet based in the United States. It was formed in Israel in about 2000 by students at the Jerusalem Academy Middle School of Music and Dance, when its members were teenagers.

The quartet moved to the United States in 2004 to continue its professional studies, graduating in 2010 from the Professional String Quartet Training Program at the New England Conservatory.  They performed the Schubert Cello Quintet with their mentor Paul Katz for their final recital.

The group follows the relatively rare practice of having the two violinists switch parts periodically. Grand Prize winners of the 2006 Fischoff National Chamber Music Competition, they have also been awarded First Prize at the international competition "Franz Schubert And The Music Of Modernity" in Graz, Austria (2003). After winning the Székely Prize for their performance of Bartók, as well as the overall Third Prize at the Banff International String Quartet Competition in 2007, the American Record Guide described the Ariel Quartet as "a consummate ensemble gifted with utter musicality and remarkable interpretive power" and called their performance of Beethoven's Quartet Op. 132 "the pinnacle of the competition."

The Ariel Quartet has performed extensively in Israel, Europe, and North America, including such venues as the Louvre in Paris, Kaisersaal in Frankfurt ("…a tour de force," said Frankfurter Allgemeine), Jordan Hall in Boston, and the Washington Performing Arts Society, the Corcoran Gallery, and the Kennedy Center in Washington, D.C.  In the 2010-2011 season the quartet participated in a Beethoven cycle at the National Gallery of Art in Washington DC, and was the string quartet accompaniment to the competitors at the 13th Arthur Rubinstein International Piano Master Competition in May 2011.

In addition to performing the traditional string quartet repertoire, the Ariel Quartet regularly collaborates with many Israeli and non-Israeli musicians and composers, including pianists Roman Rabinovich, Alexander Gavrylyuk, Stefano Miceli and Yaron Kohlberg; the Jerusalem String Quartet; composers Matan Porat, Matti Kovler, and Menachem Wiesenberg; clarinetist Moran Katz; violist Roger Tapping; and the Zukerman Chamber Players. The Ariel Quartet has been the quartet-in-residence at the Yellow Barn Music Festival in Vermont.

In early 2012, the quartet was named string-quartet-in-residence at the University of Cincinnati's College-Conservatory of Music.

Members
The members of the quartet are
 Gershon Gerchikov (violin)
 Alexandra Kazovsky (violin)
 Jan Grüning (viola), joined the quartet in 2011
 Amit Even-Tov (violincello)

References

External links 
Ariel Quartet website

Israeli classical music groups
String quartets
Musical groups from Cincinnati